Sheykh Madi (also Romanized as Sheykh Mādī; also known as Sheykh Mehdī) is a village in Dehdez Rural District, Dehdez District, Izeh County, Khuzestan Province, Iran. At the 2006 census, its population was 458, in 86 families.

References 

Populated places in Izeh County